Karnig Sarkissian (born 1953) is an Armenian-American singer from Aleppo, Syria. He is best known throughout the Armenian diaspora for his performance of Armenian patriotic and revolutionary songs. He is a supporter of the Armenian Revolutionary Federation (ARF).

Prison
In 1982, Sarkissian, who was resident of Anaheim, California at the time, was convicted of taking part in a plot to bomb the Turkish Consulate in Philadelphia. According to the conviction, his accomplices were Viken Vasken Yacoubian of Glendale, Vicken Archavir Sarkissian Hovsepian of Santa Monica, Dikran Sarkis Berberian of Glendale, and Steven John Dadaian of Canoga Park. They were accused of being members of the militant group Justice Commandos of the Armenian Genocide (JCAG).

His prison sentence was cut short. After his release from prison, Karnig Sarkissian resumed his artistic activity and is a popular singer in the Armenian diaspora.

Discography

Studio Albums
Mayrigis (1977)
Ho Hi Ta (1977)
Hayotz Mardigner (1985)
Lisbon Five (1989)
Gharapaghi Engadznerin (1993)
Meghavore Tashnagtsutyun (1995)
Ezkush Kordzir Hayasdanum (1996)
Ver Gats Joghovourt (1997)
Heghapoghagan (1999)
Abril 24 (1999)
Zinial Baykar (1999)
Housher (2009)

Live Albums
Live In Los Angeles (1988)
Live In Concert (1995)

Compilation Albums
Heghapoghashouchi Yerkarvesdi Janabare (2014)

Singles
Partsratsir Partsratsour (1995)
Bantarkyali Yerke (2008)
Garo Kaplanian (2008)
Hyrig (2008)
Khachig Arabian (2008)
Serj Tovmasian (2008)
Haghterk Mardashounch (2008)
Jeshmardoutyoun (2008)
Nathaline Sarkisyan (2010)
Baykare Hayots (feat. Garo Gaboudagian) (2011)
Homentmen (2012)
Yeraplur (2013)
Baruyr Doudaklian (2013)
Nemesis (2013)
50 Daris (2013)
Syriahay Kacher (2013)
Hay Dignotch Hamar (2014)
Hin Houys Talar (2014)
Vanetsi Gdrich (2014)
Hokehankisd (2015)
Arjani (feat. Sevak Amroyan) (2017)
Arakadsi Kaykerk (2018)
100 Amyag Kaylerk (2018)
Tebi Sassoun (feat. Harout Pamboukjian) (2018)
Veradardzir (feat. Joseph Krikorian) (2018)
Ganche Hoghin (feat. Tro Krikorian) (2018)

References

External links

 Karnig Sarkissian MySpace site
 Karnig Sarkissian Facebook

21st-century Armenian male singers
Syrian people of Armenian descent
Syrian emigrants to the United States
People convicted on terrorism charges
Living people
People from Aleppo
20th-century Armenian male singers
1953 births